Michael Otmar Hengartner (born 5 June 1966, St. Gallen, Switzerland) is a Swiss-Canadian biochemist and molecular biologist. From February 2020 he has been president of the ETH Board. Before that he was the president of the University of Zurich and president of the Swiss Rectors' Conference, swissuniversities.

Bibliography 
Hengartner was born in 1966, the son of a Swiss mathematics professor. The family moved first to Paris, later to Bloomington, Indiana and then to Quebec City, where he grew up.

He studied biochemistry at the Université Laval in Quebec, and graduated with a B.S. in 1988. He received a doctorate in 1994 from the Massachusetts Institute of Technology under H. Robert Horvitz. He then led a research group at the Cold Spring Harbor Laboratory. In 1997, he co-founded the biotech company Devgen. In 2001, he was appointed to the newly established Ernst Hadorn Endowed Professorship at the Institute of Molecular Biology of the University of Zurich. In 2008, he co-founded the scientific consultancy company Evaluescience. From 2009 to 2014, he was Dean of the Faculty of Mathematics and Natural Sciences of the University of Zurich; and from 2014 to 2019, rector of the University of Zurich. Since 2019, he has been director of the ETH Board and since 2009, a member of the National Academy of Sciences Leopoldina. On February 1, 2020, he took up his position as President of the ETH Board. In August 2020 Hengartner spoke about the Swiss lack of courage to "think big" despite investing heavily in education and basic research. He confirmed ETH Zurich's efforts to fostering a culture of innovation achieving faster market maturity of innovative products, especially in the area of digitization and climate. In November 2021 Hengartner highlighted the concerns about the consequences of brain drain from Switzerland. He is a member of the Swiss National Science Foundation.

Private life 
Hengartner is married to biologist Denise Hengartner. The couple has six children.

Research interests 
Hengartner is researching the molecular basis of apoptosis. He uses especially the nematode Caenorhabditis elegans as molecular organism. He is also investigating mechanisms of cancer, Alzheimer's and geriatric diseases.

Awards 
 2003: Dr. Josef Steiner Cancer Research Prize
 2006: National Latsis Prize of Switzerland
 2006: Cloëtta Prize
 2010: Credit Suisse Award for Best Teaching from the University of Zurich
 2016: Honorary doctorate from Université Pierre et Marie Curie and the University of Paris-Sorbonne

References

External links 
 The Hengartner Lab at the University of Zurich
 Curriculum vitae National Academy of Sciences Leopoldina
 Prof. Dr. * Michael O. Hengartner, President of the ETH Board
Hengartner as rector at the University of Zurich

Swiss biochemists
Canadian biochemists
Molecular biologists
1966 births
Université Laval alumni
Massachusetts Institute of Technology alumni
People associated with the University of Zurich
People from St. Gallen (city)
Swiss emigrants to Canada
Living people